Antepipona is a palearctic, afrotropical and indomalayan genus of potter wasps.

Species

Antepipona aberrata
Antepipona aequinoxialis
Antepipona aestimabilis
Antepipona alberti
Antepipona albocincta
Antepipona albomarginata
Antepipona albomarginatus
Antepipona albosignata
Antepipona anonyma
Antepipona aprica
Antepipona arabica
Antepipona arethusae
Antepipona armata
Antepipona asperategula
Antepipona aurantiaca
Antepipona barrei
Antepipona bhutanensis
Antepipona biarcuata
Antepipona biguttata
Antepipona bipustulata
Antepipona bispinosa
Antepipona brincki
Antepipona brunneola
Antepipona brunnipes
Antepipona cabrerai
Antepipona caelebs
Antepipona cameroni
Antepipona cariniceps
Antepipona celonitiformis
Antepipona ceylonica
Antepipona chobauti
Antepipona cingulifera
Antepipona concors
Antepipona conradsi
Antepipona consentanea
Antepipona convexiventris
Antepipona cribrata
Antepipona curialis
Antepipona darfurensis
Antepipona dauensis
Antepipona declarata
Antepipona defecta
Antepipona deflenda
Antepipona deflendiformis
Antepipona defracta
Antepipona dentella
Antepipona dimorpha
Antepipona doursii
Antepipona empeyi
Antepipona exaltata
Antepipona excelsa
Antepipona fatua
Antepipona ferruginosa
Antepipona fervida
Antepipona fredens
Antepipona frontalis
Antepipona glabrata
Antepipona goniodes
Antepipona guichardi
Antepipona guineensis
Antepipona gusenleitneri
Antepipona guttata
Antepipona hamoni
Antepipona hansi
Antepipona haryana
Antepipona hessei
Antepipona hispanica
Antepipona hova
Antepipona iconia
Antepipona iconius
Antepipona injucunda
Antepipona insana
Antepipona intricata
Antepipona irakensis
Antepipona jacoti
Antepipona jocosa
Antepipona karadgensis
Antepipona karibae
Antepipona kashmirensis
Antepipona kassalensis
Antepipona laevigata
Antepipona lemuriensis
Antepipona liberator
Antepipona luzonensis
Antepipona mamathensis
Antepipona melanodonta
Antepipona menkei
Antepipona metatarsalis
Antepipona metemmensis
Antepipona minor
Antepipona minutissima
Antepipona monomotapa
Antepipona montana
Antepipona mucronata
Antepipona nicotrae
Antepipona nigricornis
Antepipona nigrior
Antepipona obesa
Antepipona omanensis
Antepipona orbata
Antepipona orbitalis
Antepipona ornaticaudis
Antepipona osmania
Antepipona ovalis
Antepipona paglianoi
Antepipona pakasae
Antepipona paradeflenda
Antepipona paralastoroides
Antepipona penetrata
Antepipona peregrinabunda
Antepipona plurimaculata
Antepipona pontebae
Antepipona praeclara
Antepipona prompta
Antepipona pruthii
Antepipona pseudosenex
Antepipona pulchella
Antepipona pulchellula
Antepipona pulchripilosella
Antepipona quadrituberculata
Antepipona raffrayi
Antepipona rikatlensis
Antepipona romanoffi
Antepipona rubicunda
Antepipona rufescens
Antepipona scutellaris
Antepipona scuttelaris
Antepipona senegalensis
Antepipona sesquicincta
Antepipona sexfasciata
Antepipona seyrigi
Antepipona shantungensis
Antepipona siamensis
Antepipona sibilans
Antepipona signatus
Antepipona silaos
Antepipona solstitialis
Antepipona specifica
Antepipona specularis
Antepipona squamigera
Antepipona stevensoniana
Antepipona sudanensis
Antepipona tekensis
Antepipona tenuis
Antepipona thailandia
Antepipona tropicalis
Antepipona tunisiana
Antepipona turbulenta
Antepipona tydides
Antepipona tylocifica
Antepipona vaalensis
Antepipona vagabunda
Antepipona varentzowi
Antepipona verhoeffi
Antepipona vescovilis
Antepipona villiersi
Antepipona yemenensis

References

Biological pest control wasps
Potter wasps
Articles containing video clips